

Lela Alene Brooks (February 7, 1908 – September 11, 1990) was a Canadian speed skater and multiple world-record holder. She specialized in short track skating.

Biography
Born in Toronto, Brooks was the first female member of the Old Orchard Skating Club and entered her first race at age 12. Her father, a dental technician, and her mother both skated and encouraged their kids toward the sport. She had two siblings, one of which was an older brother who also went on to become a Canadian skating champion. She began setting Ontario and Canadian records in 1923 at the age of 15. By the end of 1925, when she was 17, Brooks had broken six world records. She would ultimately set 17 world records and win 65 championships over her skating career, all done within North America.

At the 1932 Winter Olympics in Lake Placid, New York, she participated in three demonstration events, all with competitors from Canada and the United States. She made it to the finals in all three events, but placed no higher than fourth. Her time in the 1500 m heats, 2:54.0, was more than 15 seconds under the official world record, but the time was not recognised since the race was skated under the North American mass start rules.

In 1933, Brooks was listed among her country's elite athletes as one of "Canada's Big Trains" by the Toronto Star. Later that year, her divorce from her first husband, Arthur Potter, was widely publicized. Despite all of her achievements, Brooks remained an amateur athlete throughout her career and did not employ a formal coach. She did receive some limited sponsorship, however, as CCM provided her with $10 per week and two pairs of skates each season. She was also sponsored in her early years by millionaire ice hockey team owner Teddy Oke.

She qualified for the 1936 Winter Olympics, the first time women's speed skating competed officially, but chose to retire. Later that year, she married druggist Russ Campbell and moved to Owen Sound, Ontario, where he opened a pharmacy. They had four children together, including at least one daughter, Dorothy Jane Campbell (1947–1978). Campbell passed away in 1967 after 31 years of marriage. Brooks died in Owen Sound at age 82 and, though she had married a third husband, Cliff Bleich, in 1972, she was buried in Owen Sound's Greenwood Cemetery with her second husband, Russ.

In 1972, Brooks was inducted into both the Speed Skating Canada Hall of Fame and Canada's Sports Hall of Fame.

Championships

1923
440 yards, Girls Under 18 – Ontario Championship
1 mile Indoor, Open – Ontario Championship

1924
440 yards, Girls Under 16 – Canadian Championship
880 yards, Girls Under 18 – Canadian Championship
880 yards, Ladies Open – Canadian Championship
Winner of Silver Skates Derby, Chicago

1925
440 yards, Girls Under 16, Ontario Championship
3/4 mile, Open – Ontario Championship
880 yards, Open – Ontario Championship
220 yards, Open – Canadian Championship
880 yards, Girls Under 18 – Canadian Championship 
440 yards, Open – Canadian Championship
880 yards, Open – Canadian Championship
1 mile, Open – Canadian Championship
880 yards, Under 18 – Indoor Ontario Championship
220 yards, Open – Indoor Ontario Championship
440 yards, Open – Indoor Ontario Championship
880 yards, Open – Indoor Ontario Championship
Winner and Lap Prize Winner – Silver Skates Derby, Chicago
220 yards, Ladies Open – Chicago
440 yards, Ladies Open – Chicago
220 yards, International Championships, Pittsburgh
440 yards, International Championships, Pittsburgh
1 mile, International Championships, Pittsburgh
For 3 years – Winner of Sidney E. Ballard Trophy, presented to the girls under 18, Old Orchard Speed Skating Club Annual Competition – 440, 880,

1926
880 yards, Under 18 – Canadian Championship
440 yards, Open – Canadian Championship
880 yards, Open – Canadian Championship
1 mile, Open – Canadian Championship
220 yards, Outdoor International Championships, Detroit
440 yards, Outdoor International Championships, Detroit
880 yards, Outdoor International Championships, Detroit
1 mile, Outdoor International Championships, Detroit
440 yards, Indoor International Championships, Pittsburgh
1 mile, Indoor International Championships, Pittsburgh
440 yards, Ladies Open – Worlds Championships, Saint John, New Brunswick
880 yards, Ladies Open – Worlds Championships, Saint John, New Brunswick
1 mile, Ladies Open – Worlds Championships, Saint John, New Brunswick
Overall Ladies World Champion, Saint John, New Brunswick
220 yards, Open – Middle Atlantic Championships, Newburgh, New York
440 yards, Open – Middle Atlantic Championships, Newburgh, New York
880 yards, Open – Middle Atlantic Championships, Newburgh, New York

1927
220 yards, Ladies Open – Indoor International Championships, Pittsburgh
880 yards, Ladies Open – Indoor International Championships, Pittsburgh
1 mile, Ladies Open – Indoor International Championships, Pittsburgh
440 yards, Outdoor Canadian Championships
880 yards, Outdoor Canadian Championships
1 mile, Outdoor Canadian Championships
220 yards, Indoor Canadian Championships, Quebec City
440 yards, Indoor Canadian Championships, Quebec City
880 yards, Indoor Canadian Championships, Quebec City
1 mile, Indoor Canadian Championships, Quebec City
220 yards, Ladies Open – City of Toronto Championships
440 yards, Ladies Open – City of Toronto Championships

1928
220 yards, Middle Atlantic Championships, Newburgh, New York
440 yards, Middle Atlantic Championships, Newburgh, New York
220 yards, Indoor Championships, Detroit
440 yards, Indoor Championships, Detroit
880 yards, Indoor Championships, Detroit
1 mile, Mardi Gras Carnival, Detroit, broke World's Record at 3:13 4/5
Winner of Oakland Sports Coupe for breaking World's Record at Mardi Gras Carnival, Detroit
1 mile, Canadian Championship, broke World's Record

1929
440 yards, North American Championship, Detroit
220 yards, Ontario Outdoor Championship
440 yards, Ontario Outdoor Championship
880 yards, Ontario Outdoor Championship

1930
1/2 mile, North American Outdoor Championships, Ottawa, broke World's Record
3/4 mile, North American Outdoor Championships, Ottawa, broke World's Record
North American Point Champion

1932 – 1933
880 yards, International Invitation, Detroit
1 mile, International Invitation, Detroit
1 mile, Open – Skate Derby, Detroit
Championship – United States Western Indoor Meet
880 yards & , International Match Races with Helen Bina, U.S. National Champion
1 mile, Toronto Championships at Varsity
440 yards, Toronto Championships at Varsity

1934
North American Indoor Championships, Toronto

1935
Points Champion, North American Indoor, Saint John, New Brunswick

References

External links

1908 births
1990 deaths
Canadian female speed skaters
Olympic speed skaters of Canada
Canadian female short track speed skaters
People from Old Toronto
Sportspeople from Toronto
Skating people from Ontario
Speed skaters at the 1932 Winter Olympics
20th-century Canadian women